Kevin John Latouf (born 7 September 1985) is a South African born English cricketer.  Latouf is a right-handed batsman who bowls right-arm medium pace.  He was born at Pretoria, Transvaal Province.

Educated at Millfield School before progressing to Barton Peveril Sixth Form College, Latouf first played for England Under-19 in 2005, at both youth Test and One Day International.

After initially playing Second XI cricket for Hampshire, Latouf made his first XI debut for the county in a List A match against Surrey in the 2005 Cheltenham & Gloucester Trophy.  During that same competition, he was a member of Hampshire's victorious final team which defeated Warwickshire by 18 runs.  From 2005 to 2006, he represented Hampshire in 11 List A matches, the last of which came against Worcestershire in the 2008 Friends Provident Trophy.  Inconsistent with the bat, Latouf scored 90 runs in his 11 List A matches, coming at a batting average of 11.25 and a high score of 25.

In the 2006 season, he played his only first-class match for Hampshire, against Loughborough UCCE, scoring 29 runs in his only innings.  He was released by Hampshire at the end of the 2008 season having played only one first team match all season, and being lent to Warwickshire for one month.

References

External links
Kevin Latouf at ESPNcricinfo

1985 births
Living people
People from Pretoria
People educated at Millfield
English cricketers
Hampshire cricketers